Mickael Gordon "Mick" Thomson (born November 3, 1973) is an American musician. He is one of two guitarists of the heavy metal band Slipknot, in which he is designated #7. Thomson met Slipknot founding members Anders Colsefni, Donnie Steele and Paul Gray through their mutual involvement within the death metal band Body Pit, which he later joined in early 1996. Following the departure of founding member and drummer Joey Jordison in 2013, Thomson is now the third longest-serving member of Slipknot.

Early life 
Thomson grew up having a "fascination with death metal bands", including Morbid Angel, although he has also named the Beatles as one of his major musical influences. He began his career playing guitar in a number of local bands in his hometown of Des Moines, Iowa, most notably death metal outfit Body Pit, formed in 1993. Original Slipknot members Anders Colsefni (vocals), Donnie Steele (guitar) and Paul Gray (bass) were all fellow members of Body Pit during this period. In addition to performing in the band, Thomson gave guitar lessons to local students at Ye Olde Guitar Shop on 70th Street in Des Moines.

Career 
Thomson joined Slipknot in the summer of 1996, replacing Craig Jones on guitar after he became the band's full-time sampler. The first Slipknot album on which Thomson performed was the 1999 self-titled debut. Speaking about the process of recording the album, he recalled in an interview for Revolver magazine that "It was a nightmarish hell to do that fucking record", primarily due to the group's lack of money, poor quality of food, and other band members' bad habits.

Upon joining the band, Thomson wore a hockey mask which he bought from a store, compared by author Joel McIver to that worn by Hannibal Lecter in the film The Silence of the Lambs. The guitarist's mask would remain much the same throughout his career, with only minor changes made for each album cycle, which he claimed was because he "pretty much nailed it ... for being able to get across how I am". Speaking in 2008, Thomson played down the amount of consideration which went into the mask's design and meaning, proclaiming that "I had my original latex hockey mask way back and then my leather one and I was using those designs and it morphed into what it is now. There isn't something crazy creative about it." Thomson also chose #7 in the band, claiming that it was his "lucky number".

Outside of Slipknot, Thomson has collaborated with several other bands. Along with bandmate Paul Gray, he appeared on a Death tribute album organised by James Murphy. In 2007, he performed the second guitar solo on Malevolent Creation's "Deliver My Enemy", released on Doomsday X. Speaking about his appearance on the song, which was engineered in part by Slipknot DJ Sid Wilson, Thomson claimed that he was "proud beyond words to have been asked to be part of this recording". In 2011, he performed guest lead guitar on Necrophagia's album Deathtrip 69. Thomson is also featured in the music video for "No Pity on the Ants" by thrash metal band Lupara, directed by Frankie Nasso and released in 2007.

Equipment 
During the early 2000's and before signing with Ibanez, Thomson played signature model B.C. Rich guitars – mainly the Warlock, but also sporting the Rich Bich on occasion. His personal Warlock was a USA made Custom, with mahogany body, maple neck, and ebony fretboard. It sported the old style B.C. Rich "R" logo, and could be seen with either a gloss black finish with white binding, or red with contrasting black binding. It had custom "HATE" inlays at the fifth through second fretboard positions. There were no other fretboard markers. It had a hardtail bridge, dual EMG humbuckers in the bridge and neck position, and three-way pickup selector wired to a volume control. There was also an NJ Warlock Signature Series offered for retail sale. Visually, this version differed from his custom model in that it had a rosewood fretboard, the B.C. Rich script logo imprint on the headstock and "Mick #7" signature reproduced on the backside of the headstock, as well as a "Signature Series" 12th fret inlay.

Thomson is known for playing Ibanez MTM guitars both in the studio and on tour, all of which are handmade by the company's artist shop luthier Tak Hosono. The guitars feature Seymour Duncan EMTY Blackout pickups and d'Addario EXL117 strings. He began working with the company in 2003, during the recording process for Slipknot's third studio album Vol. 3: (The Subliminal Verses). His effects pedals include a Maxon OD820, a Death by Audio Fuzz War, an MXR Carbon Copy Delay, an Electro-Harmonix Bassballs Envelope Filter and a custom fuzz pedal made by his guitar technician Kevin Allen.

In July 2016, Jackson Guitars announced that Thomson had joined their artist roster. Speaking about joining the company, Thomson proclaimed that he was "immensely proud to be a part of the Jackson family", praising his custom Double Rhoads and Soloist models as "incredible".
Thomson currently has three signature Jackson soloists, a limited edition USA, a standard USA, and an import, all featuring a reverse headstock, mahogany body, neck through graphite reinforced maple neck, locking nut, single volume and three position blade switch, and his signature Seymour Duncan EMTY Blackout pickups. The limited USA model comes with a fixed mounted Floyd Rose pro bridge, while the standard USA and the import come with a similar Jackson designed hardtail bridge with finetuners.

Personal life 

Outside of performing with Slipknot, Thomson is known to keep a relatively low profile. Speaking on the band's 2006 video release Voliminal: Inside the Nine, he explained that "I like my quiet time; I like to be left the fuck alone", while pointing out that he "loves" being a part of the band. In an interview with Jon Wiederhorn for Revolver magazine about the making of Iowa, the guitarist explained that "On days off, you'd never see me out of my hotel room ... I'd rather be alone than be around a bunch of people that I don't care about, don't care about me or are fuckin' full of shit".

Thomson married his girlfriend Stacy Riley on October 5, 2012. He has a number of tattoos, including the word 'seven' on his left arm (reflecting his number in Slipknot), and the word 'hate' in Japanese writing on his right arm. Thomson is famously a devoted fan of the Las Vegas Raiders football team.

On March 11, 2015, Thomson was injured during a knife fight with his brother Andrew outside a house in his hometown of Clive, Iowa. It was reported by The Des Moines Register that both men were drunk at the time, and that the Slipknot guitarist suffered "serious but not life-threatening" injuries after being stabbed in the back of the head. Both Mick and Andrew were later charged with "disorderly conduct by fighting", after an investigation determined that both were responsible for the incident. Mick and Andrew were both hospitalised after the fight, but Slipknot vocalist Corey Taylor tweeted on the day of the incident to assure fans that Thomson would recover.

Discography

with Slipknot

Studio albums 
Slipknot (1999)
Iowa (2001)
Vol. 3: (The Subliminal Verses) (2004)
All Hope Is Gone (2008)
.5: The Gray Chapter (2014)
We Are Not Your Kind (2019)
 The End, So Far (2022)

with Malevolent Creation

Studio albums 
Doomsday X (2007) – "Deliver My Enemy"

with Necrophagia

Studio albums 
Deathtrip 69 (2011) – guest lead guitar parts

Filmography 
 1999: Welcome to Our Neighborhood
 2002: Disasterpieces
 2002: Rollerball
 2006: Voliminal: Inside the Nine
 2008: Nine: The Making of "All Hope Is Gone"
 2009: Of the (sic): Your Nightmares, Our Dreams
 2010: (sic)nesses
 2011: Goat
 2017: Day of the Gusano: Live in Mexico

References 

General sources

External links 

Slipknot official website

1973 births
Living people
Masked musicians
Musicians from Des Moines, Iowa
American heavy metal guitarists
Slipknot (band) members
Roadrunner Records artists
Grammy Award winners
Guitarists from Iowa
Stabbing survivors